Harry Spencer (18 September 1868 — 13 October 1937) was an English cricketer who played for Derbyshire in 1895.

Spencer was born in Northowram, in the West Riding of Yorkshire, and was the son of William Spencer, a grocer, and his wife Mary.

Spencer played a minor counties match for Staffordshire in July 1895. He played a first-class match for Derbyshire during the 1895 season against Surrey in July. He scored a duck in the first innings but the match was abandoned as a draw before he had a chance to bat in the second innings.

He was a right-handed batsman but scored no runs in first-class cricket.

Spencer died at Regent's Park, London at the age of 69.

References

1868 births
1937 deaths
English cricketers
Derbyshire cricketers
Staffordshire cricketers
People from Northowram
Cricketers from Yorkshire